William Albert Grew (August 26, 1885 - October 26, 1967) was an American actor, sketch-writer and revue playwright who wrote, directed, and performed in nine Broadway productions from 1924 to 1931. His and his wife, actress Gwendolyn Pates, had a stock company called the Grew-Pates Players, performing in the United States and Canada from 1914 to 1920.

Plays
The Sap 1924 - twice filmed
The Mating Season 18 July 1927, Selwyn
My Girl Friday at the Theatre Republic 1929
Nice Women at the Longacre Theatre, 1929
She Lived Next to the Firehouse 1931 - William A. Grew and Harry Delf

References

American male dramatists and playwrights
Place of birth missing
Place of death missing
1885 births
1967 deaths
American male stage actors
20th-century American male actors
20th-century American male writers
20th-century American dramatists and playwrights